Roger Federer's first tournament as a professional was the ATP Gstaad in 1998, where he faced Lucas Arnold Ker in the round of 32 and lost, 4–6, 4–6. Federer's first final came at the Marseille Open, which was in 2000, and he lost to fellow Swiss Marc Rosset, 6–2, 3–6, 6–7.  Federer's first tournament win was at the 2001 Milan Indoor tournament, where he defeated Julien Boutter, 6–4, 6–7, 6–4. The most prestigious event finals he was in at this time was the Miami Masters event, where he lost to Andre Agassi, 3–6, 3–6, 6–3, 4–6. In addition, Federer won his first Master Series event at the Hamburg Masters on clay, 6–1, 6–3, 6–4, over Marat Safin.

Federer made ten singles finals between 1998 and 2002, of which he won four and lost six. Federer made six doubles finals during this time, but lost the Indian Wells Masters event in 2002. The most prestigious events he won were the Hamburg Masters in 2002 and two Rotterdam 500 series events in 2001 and 2002.

Yearly summary 1998–2002

1998: Joining the Tour
In July 1998, the 16-year-old Federer played his first ATP Tour event, the ATP Gstaad, where he lost to Lucas Arnold Ker in straight sets. Although he played two more ATP tournaments in 1998, the majority of his matches were still at the Junior level. However, Federer did face from the top 10 player for the first time in Andre Agassi in Basel, losing 3–6, 2–6.

1999: Grand Slam & Davis Cup debuts, Challenger titles, top 100
In April 1999, he debuted for the Swiss Davis Cup team against Italy and finished the year ranked world no. 66. During that time, he was the youngest player in the top 100. He also competed in his first Grand Slam tournament at the French Open, but lost to Patrick Rafter in the first round after a four-set match. He also made his first appearance at Wimbledon, where he entered as a wildcard. After a five-set match, he lost in the first round to Czech Jiří Novák, who was then ranked no. 59. In the same tournament, Federer partnered Lleyton Hewitt in doubles, where they reached the round of 16, losing to Rafter and Jonas Björkman in another five-set match.

2000: First finals, Olympic 4th place, top 30
In January 2000, Federer competed for the first time in the Australian Open, losing to no. 49 Arnaud Clément of France in the third round. He then equaled this achievement in his first US Open, losing in the third round to no. 12 Juan Carlos Ferrero of Spain. After reaching the semifinals at the 2000 Sydney Olympics, Federer reached his first ATP final in Marseille, where he lost to compatriot Marc Rosset, and was also the runner-up in his home tournament at Basel. He did, however, win the Hopman Cup in Australia alongside Martina Hingis, defeating the US team in the final. Federer beat Jan-Michael Gambill in straight sets. Even though he failed to make an impression at Grand Slams, it was the first year he played in all four. Federer then ended the year ranked world no. 29.

2001: Hopman Cup champion, first title, match with Sampras
Federer's first ATP tournament victory came in February 2001, where he defeated French player Julien Boutter in the final of the Milan Indoor. During the same month, he won three matches for his country in its 3–2 Davis Cup victory over the United States. After a match against Marat Safin at the Rome Masters, in which both players threw their racquets several times, Federer decided to change his temper after watching himself in the highlight reel.  He reached the quarterfinals at the French Open. He came to Wimbledon in 2001 as the 15th seed. At that tournament, Pete Sampras and Roger Federer walked onto Centre Court for their only meeting. Federer would achieve the victory of his young career in a thrilling five set match, dethroning the seven-time Wimbledon champion. This defeat ended Sampras' 31-match winning streak at the tournament. Federer lost his next match but had reached a second consecutive Grand Slam quarterfinal. He finished the year ranked no. 13.

2002: Breakthrough and top 10, but Grand Slam struggles
Federer reached his first Masters Series final in 2002 at the NASDAQ-100 Open in Key Biscayne, Florida, where he lost to Andre Agassi. He won his next Masters final in Hamburg, defeating former world No. 1 Marat Safin. This was a major breakthrough for Federer as it was his first Masters championship and his most significant title to date. He also won both his Davis Cup singles matches against former world No. 1 Russians Safin and Yevgeny Kafelnikov. He had early-round exits at the French Open and Wimbledon; Federer also suffered the devastating loss of his long-time Australian coach and mentor, Peter Carter, in a car crash in August. He jumped in the rankings from no. 13 at the end of September to no. 7 by the middle of October. This qualified him for the first time for the year-end Tennis Masters Cup. However, his run at the tournament was ended in the semifinals by then-world no. 1 and eventual champion Lleyton Hewitt. Federer reached no. 6 in the ATP Champions Race by the end of 2002.

Grand Slam performances

All Matches in Singles

1998

1999

2000

2001

2002

Yearly Records

Finals

Singles: 10 (4–6)

See also
Roger Federer
Roger Federer career statistics

References

External links
  
 ATP tour profile

1998–2002
1998 in tennis
1999 in tennis
2000 in tennis
2001 in tennis
2002 in tennis
1990s in Swiss tennis
2000s in Swiss tennis
1990s in Swiss sport
2000s in Swiss sport
Early careers by sportspeople